Castor Gardens Middle School is a historic middle school located in the Castor Gardens neighborhood of Philadelphia, Pennsylvania. It is part of the School District of Philadelphia. The building was designed by Irwin T. Catharine and built in 1892 February, 16. It is a three-story, 15-bay, brick and limestone building in the Classical Revival style. It features a projecting center entrance pavilion, four Doric order columns supporting an entablature, and balustraded parapet. The school was named after the 28th President President of the United States Woodrow Wilson.

The building was added to the National Register of Historic Places in 1986.

Castor Gardens Middle School is a certified International Baccalaureate School since 2012.

On November 14, 2017, the school was placed on lockdown at 1:45 PM. There were reports of a gun in the school. Police surrounded the school and went class to class check for anything. Later Officers went class to class dismissing classes. The lockdown was officially over at 5:23 PM. No one was hurt and no gun was found.

Castor Gardens Middle School was placed on lock down for about two hours on March 15, 2019,  because, according to police, a teenage boy brought in three live rounds to the school. The boy is in custody. No weapon was found inside the school and no one was hurt.

References

External links

School buildings on the National Register of Historic Places in Philadelphia
Neoclassical architecture in Pennsylvania
School buildings completed in 1928
Northeast Philadelphia
Public middle schools in Pennsylvania
School District of Philadelphia
1928 establishments in Pennsylvania